The canton of Magny-le-Désert is an administrative division of the Orne department, northwestern France. It was created at the French canton reorganisation which came into effect in March 2015. Its seat is in Magny-le-Désert.

It consists of the following communes:
 
Avoine
Boucé
Carrouges
Chahains
Le Champ-de-la-Pierre
La Chaux
Ciral
Écouché-les-Vallées
Fleuré
Joué-du-Bois
Joué-du-Plain
La Lande-de-Goult
La Lande-de-Lougé
Lougé-sur-Maire
Magny-le-Désert
Méhoudin
Le Ménil-Scelleur
Monts-sur-Orne
La Motte-Fouquet
L'Orée-d'Écouves
Rânes
Rouperroux
Saint-Brice-sous-Rânes
Saint-Ellier-les-Bois
Sainte-Marguerite-de-Carrouges
Sainte-Marie-la-Robert
Saint-Georges-d'Annebecq
Saint-Martin-des-Landes
Saint-Martin-l'Aiguillon
Saint-Ouen-le-Brisoult
Saint-Patrice-du-Désert
Saint-Sauveur-de-Carrouges
Sevrai
Tanques
Vieux-Pont

References

Cantons of Orne